Bartosz Broniszewski (born 23 January 1988) is a German former professional football who plays as a defender for SC Pfullendorf. He is of Polish origin.

References

External links
 Bartosz Broniszewski at Der Betze brennt 
 

1988 births
Living people
German people of Polish descent
Polish footballers
German footballers
Footballers from Munich
Association football defenders
2. Bundesliga players
Regionalliga players
1. FC Kaiserslautern players
1. FC Kaiserslautern II players
Rot-Weiss Essen players
SV Wilhelmshaven players
FV Ravensburg players
SC Pfullendorf players